Technology is the first album of the Melodic death metal band Crimson Death. It was recorded in 2001, but due to financial problems of the record label it was released in 2004 by Mythic Metal Productions.

Track listing
 The end of the novel - 04:49
 Convicts to the extinction - 04:24
 Everhate - 04:40
 My last word - 04:59
 The tower - 05:52
 Technology - 05:13
 Messengers of sadness - 05:32
 Vanity paradise - 04:57
 Song of the black river - 06:27
 Everhate [Promo Version] - 04:42
 Song of the black river [Promo Version] - 06:12

Musicians
 Carlos Delgado - bass guitar
 Rafael Cubillas - drums
 Edgar Rodríguez - guitar
 Geyner Valencia - guitar, vocals

Production information
 Recorded at Session Studio in February 2001
 Produced by John Capcha & Crimson Death
 Executive producer Martin Espíritu R.
 Engineered by John Capcha
 Art concept by Carlos Delgado
 Art work by Carlos Degaldo and Edgar Rodríguez
 Crimson Death icon by Jose Melo
 Photography by Herbert Añari

External links
Technology at Metalstorm.ee
Official band discography page

2004 albums
Crimson Death (band) albums